Over the Top is the debut album by the American heavy metal band White Wizzard released on February 8, 2010 in Europe and March 9, 2010 in North America, through Earache Records. The limited edition was available for pre-order on the Earache Records US webstore until February 8, 2010.

A music video for the song "Over the Top" was released on January 29, 2010. The video featured the band playing in a snowy Western town and combating a "Jazz Wizard".

The video was directed by Dave Vorhes, who directed White Wizzard's previous music video as well.

Track listing

Personnel

White Wizzard
Wyatt "The Screamin' Demon" Anderson - vocals
Jon Leon - bass, lead and rhythm guitars on tracks 1,2,9
Erik Kluiber - lead and rhythm guitars
Chad Bryan - rhythm and harmony guitars (appears in the credits, but does not play in the album)
Jesse Appelhans - drums
Giovanni Durst - drums on bonus tracks

Production
Ralph Patlan - producer, engineer, mixing, 2nd guitar solo on track 1, outro guitar on track 9

References

2010 debut albums
White Wizzard albums
Earache Records albums